Inocoterone (developmental code name RU-29294) is a steroid-like nonsteroidal antiandrogen (NSAA) that was never marketed. An acetate ester, inocoterone acetate, shows greater antiandrogen activity and was developed as a topical medication for the treatment of acne but showed only modest effectiveness in clinical trials and similarly was never marketed.

See also
 Cioteronel
 Delanterone
 Metogest
 Rosterolone
 Topilutamide
 Topterone

References

Abandoned drugs
Secondary alcohols
Anti-acne preparations
Enones
Three-membered rings
Nonsteroidal antiandrogens